In Olden Days is a 1952 Italian comedy drama anthology film directed by Alessandro Blasetti and featuring an ensemble cast that included Gina Lollobrigida, Amedeo Nazzari, Vittorio De Sica, Elisa Cegani, Barbara Florian, Aldo Fabrizi, Andrea Checchi and Alba Arnova.  It was shot at the Cinecittà Studios in Rome. The film's sets were designed by the art directors Dario Cecchi and Veniero Colasanti. It is also known as Times Gone By and Infidelity.

Plot

The cart of old books
A good-natured peddler of old books shows his customers some works from the past and is pranked by the rowdy son of a newsagent.

Excelsior dance
Filmed reconstruction of the Excelsior Ball, an allegorical late-century dance by the composer Romualdo Marenco performed for the first time at the Teatro alla Scala in Milan on 11 January 1881.

Less than a day 
Two lovers, for contingent reasons, manage to see each other in a hotel room once a year, for a few hours, but due to some quarrels and jealousies they are unable to consume their relationship.

The Sardinian drummer 
During the first war of independence fought against the Austrians, a very young drummer, delivering an important message to the Italian command, is hit and loses a leg (episode from the book "Cuore").

Matter of interest 
Two peasants scramble for possession of manure dung.

The idyll 
Tender summer idyll between two children from upper-class families. Guido, because of a kiss given to the sweet Greek girl Filli, wonders if the kiss could have generated a child and also fears for his maid, who had a baby without being married. With the end of the summer comes the painful separation.

The vice 
A trader discovers his wife's cheating with his business partner. Upon returning home, at first he pretends nothing has happened, then with an excuse he sends the maid away and after denying his wife her forgiveness, threatening to take her children away from her, induces her to take her life.

Potpourri of songs 
Story of a happy courtship and marriage, enlivened by the birth of a child and concluded with the departure of her husband for the war, from which she may not return.

The songs to which the title refers are Lo specio me ga finger, Oh Trieste, oh blessed Trieste, Forbidden Music, Un peu d'amour, Le valse bleu, Baciami baciami, Santa Lucia and Tripoli bel suol d'amore.

The Trial of Phryne 
Naples. A commoner is tried for trying to poison her husband and mother-in-law together. Thanks to her irrepressible beauty, the defense attorney appointed ex officio succeeds with an inspired and vehement harangue to overturn the situation, dragging the public and jurors to the side of the accused.

Obtained from a short story by Edoardo Scarfoglio, and referring to an ancient story of the ethereal Phryne, he remained famous above all because Vittorio De Sica, in the role of the defender of the prosperous graces of a commoner (played by Gina Lollobrigida), coined the term "increased physics" which will in fact mark an era and will be widely used throughout the 1950s and most of the 1960s. The exact reference, in the sentence pronounced in the film by De Sica during the speech, is: "increased physics" as opposed to the phrase "psychic handicapped".

Vittorio De Sica in this episode is at his first appearance alongside Gina Lollobrigida; both actors, the following year, will seize great popularity as the marshal and the bersagliera in the film Bread, love and fantasy directed by Luigi Comencini.

It should only be noted that the scene of the "trial in court" for Italian cinema is an unmissable event, starting with the forerunners. Defendant, get up! by Mario Mattoli (1939) with Erminio Macario up to San Giovanni taken off by Amleto Palermi (1940) with Totò, and in this film he finds a fundamental scene for aficionados. Later scenes of trials will make the fortune of Nando Mericoni "American in Rome" (Alberto Sordi) in the duology of Stefano Vanzina Un giorno in magistrale (1953) and Un americano a Roma (1954), up to Christian De Sica who in 1984 will pay an explicit homage to this scene played by his father, as Praetor of the film Mi fa causa (1984).

Cast

Il carrettino dei libri vecchi
 Aldo Fabrizi: the street vendor of ancient books; 
 Pina Renzi: the newsagent
 Enzo Staiola: his son
 Luigi Cimara: gentleman on the convertible 
 Marisa Merlini: lady on the convertible 
 Galeazzo Benti: her lover 
 Mario Riva: the fussy customer

Ballo Excelsior
 Alba Arnova: the Progress
 Carlo Mazzone-Clementi: the Obscurantism
 Anna Maria Bugliari: Italy 
 Mirdza Capanna: the Light 
 Antonio Acqua: the Science
 Dino Raffaelli: the Art 
 Filippo Morucci: Alessandro Volta

Meno di un giorno
 Alba Arnova: Matilde
 Andrea Checchi: Camillo
 Gondrano Trucchi: the station master
 Bruno Corelli: the waiter
 Gabriele Tinti: the young man on the train
 Silvio Bagolini: the guide

Il Tamburino Sardo
 Enzo Cerusico: il tamburino
 Vittorio Vaser: il capitano
 Attilio Tosato: il sergente
 Guido Celano: il tenente
 Ugo Sasso: a soldier
 Yvonne Cocco: a nun
 Pietro Tordi: un infermiere

Questioni d'interesse
 Arnoldo Foà: il contadino
 Folco Lulli: l'altro contadino
 Mario Mazza: il carabiniere

L'idillio
 Maurizio Di Nardo: Guido
 Geraldina Parriniello: Filli
 Paolo Stoppa: Guido's father
 Rina Morelli: Guido's mother
 Sergio Tofano: Guido's grandfather
 Jone Morino: Maddalena

La morsa
 Amedeo Nazzari: Andrea Fabbri
 Elisa Cegani: Giulia, his wife 
 Roldano Lupi: Antonio Serra, her lover 
 Goliarda Sapienza: Anna, la domestica

Pot-pourri di canzoni
 Barbara Florian: the bride
 Elio Pandolfi: lo sposo
 Amalia Pellegrini: the grandmother 
 Oscar Andriani: the father 
 Elena Altieri: la moglie del maggiore
 Gian Aldo Bettoni: il maggiore

Il processo di Frine
 Gina Lollobrigida: Maria Antonia Desiderio
 Vittorio De Sica: l'avvocato difensore
 Arturo Bragaglia: il pubblico ministero
 Giovanni Grasso jr.: il presidente del tribunale
 Turi Pandolfini: primo cancelliere
 Armando Annuale: secondo cancelliere
 Vittorio Caprioli: il farmacista
 Dante Maggio: un testimone
 Umberto Sacripante 
 Liana Del Balzo 
 Alberto Talegalli
 Alfredo Rizzo 
 Alberto Sorrentino

References

Bibliography
 Diffrient, David Scott. Omnibus Films: Theorizing Transauthorial Cinema. Edinburgh University Press, 2014.

External links
 

1952 films
Films based on works by Edmondo De Amicis
Films based on works by Luigi Pirandello
1950s Italian-language films
Films directed by Alessandro Blasetti
Italian anthology films
Films scored by Alessandro Cicognini
Italian black-and-white films
Works based on Heart (novel)
Films shot at Cinecittà Studios
Italian comedy films
1950s comedy films